The Curtiss-Wright CW-12 Sport Trainer and CW-16 Light Sport (also marketed under the Travel Air brand that Curtiss-Wright had recently acquired) were high-performance training aircraft designed by Herbert Rawdon and Ted Wells and built in the United States in the early 1930s.

Development
The CW-12 and CW-16 shared the same basic design as conventional single-bay biplanes with staggered wings braced with N-struts. The pilot and instructor sat in tandem, open cockpits, the forward cockpit of the CW-12 having a single seat, while the CW-16's forward cockpit could seat two passengers side-by-side. Both versions of the aircraft were available in a variety of engine choices, and some CW-16s were exported as trainers to the air forces of Bolivia and Ecuador.

Variants

CW-12
CW-12K - version powered by  Kinner K-5 engine. Two built.
CW-12Q - version powered by  Wright-built de Havilland Gipsy. 26 built.
CW-12W - version powered by  Warner Scarab. 12 built + 1 replica

CW-16
 CW-16E - version powered by Wright J-6 Whirlwind 5 engine. (10 built).
 CW-16K - version powered by Kinner B-5 engine (11 built).
 CW-16W - version powered by Warner Scarab engine (1 built).

Operators
Civil owners in USA and United Kingdom

Argentine Navy purchased 15 CW-16Es in 1935, with 13 more possibly being built from 1938. The type remained in use until 1949.

Bolivian Air Force purchased three CW-16s in 1934, with the type in use until 1943.

Brazilian Air Force received 15 CW-16Ws, with  Warner Scarab engines in 1935, the type remaining in service until 1940.

Colombian Air Force received six CW-16s in 1933.

Ecuadorian Air Force purchased six CW-16Es in 1935, with three more CW-16s following in 1936. Three remained in use until 1944.

Specifications (CW-12Q)

References

Citations

Bibliography
  
 
 
 

1930s United States civil trainer aircraft
Single-engined tractor aircraft
Biplanes
Aircraft first flown in 1931